Lee Kin Wo (born 20 October 1967 in Hong Kong) is a former Hong Kong professional footballer.

Lee won the Hong Kong Footballer of the Year award three times during his career. He holds an AFC "A" License.

Club career
Lee Kin Wo made his debut in Hong Kong First Division League on 13 October 1985 when he was 18 years old. He is most memorable for participating the friendly match South China Athletic Association (Lee is loaned from Eastern for that match, along with Dale Tempest) versus São Paulo, the Brazilian team with national representatives Cafu, Leonardo Araújo and Zetti at that time. Finally, South China won the match by 4–2 and Lee scored the fourth goal of his team.

In May 2000, during an international friendly hosted by Macau, Lee kicked the football toward the upper body of the Macau referee Choi Kuok-kun, after several unfair decisions were being awarded in favour of the home side. Hong Kong eventually won the match by 1-0 and Choi was banned from officiating for life.

Coaching career
He was appointed as the head coach of Hong Kong national football team on 22 May 2007. The first match he led was a friendly match played away against Indonesia national football team. Hong Kong lost by 0–3 in the match.

Lee was appointed as head coach of Eastern for the second time on 19 January 2018 following the resignation of Szeto Man Chun.

Personal life
He resides with his family on Peng Chau island. His eldest son Lee Ka Wah is a former footballer.

Games of Hong Kong team coached by Lee Kin Wo

Honours

Club
Double Flower
 Hong Kong FA Cup: 1988–89
 Viceroy Cup: 1988–89

Eastern
 Hong Kong First Division: 1992–93, 1993–94, 1994–95
 Hong Kong Senior Shield: 1986–87, 1992–93, 1993–94, 2007–08
 Hong Kong FA Cup: 1992–93, 1993–94

Geylang United
 FAS Premier League: 1991

South China
 Hong Kong First Division: 1995–96, 1997–98, 1998–99
 Hong Kong FA Cup: 1997–98, 2000–01
 Hong Kong League Cup: 2001–02
 Hong Kong Viceroy Cup: 1997–98

Sun Hei
 Hong Kong First Division: 2003–04, 2004–05
 Hong Kong Senior Shield: 2004–05
 Hong Kong FA Cup: 2004–05, 2005–06
 Hong Kong League Cup: 2003–04, 2004–05

Individual
Hong Kong Footballer of the Year: 1993, 1994, 2003

References

External links

1967 births
Living people
Hong Kong footballers
Hong Kong international footballers
Association football wingers
South China AA players
Eastern Sports Club footballers
Sun Hei SC players
Shek Kip Mei SA players
Hong Kong First Division League players
Hong Kong football managers
Hong Kong national football team managers
Eastern Sports Club football managers
Footballers at the 1990 Asian Games
Footballers at the 1994 Asian Games
Hong Kong expatriate footballers
Asian Games competitors for Hong Kong
Hong Kong League XI representative players